Francisco Clavet was the defending champion of the singles event at the Dutch Open men's tennis tournament, but he lost to Magnus Gustafsson.

Gustafsson won in the final 5–7, 7–6(7–2), 2–6, 6–1, 6–0 against Jordi Arrese.

Seeds
Champion seeds are indicated in bold while text in italics indicates the round in which that seed was eliminated.

  Sergi Bruguera (second round)
  Karel Nováček (semifinals)
  Andrei Cherkasov (first round)
  Magnus Gustafsson (champion)
  Goran Prpić (second round)
  Horst Skoff (second round)
  Guillermo Pérez Roldán (first round)
  Omar Camporese (second round)

Draw

Finals

Section 1

Section 2

External links
 ATP main draw

Singles